

V

References

Lists of words